The 2012 Liga Nacional Juvenil de Voleibol Femenino (Spanish for: 2012 Women's Junior National Volleyball League) or 2012 LNJVF is the 2nd edition of the Peruvian Volleyball League. The competition is open for all 12 teams who have the A1 category in the LNSV, for this season 8 out of the 12 teams signed up. Teams were made up of U19 players.

Competing Teams
Teams were seeded according to how they finished in the previous edition.

Competition format
The competition is divided in two phases, the group round in which all teams will play once against the other three teams in the same pool, after the first round is finished, the top three teams will move on to the next round, meaning one team in each pool will be eliminated. The final round is a single round-robyn with all six teams playing one against the other 5, including the teams that had already played each other in the group round, the top team ranking wise will be named champion.

First round

Pool A

|}

|}

Pool B

|}

|}

Final round

Final ranking

|}

Matches

|}

Final Standing

Individual awards

Most Valuable Player
Danae Carranza (Alianza Lima)
Best Scorer
Ángela Leyva (Universidad San Martín)
Best Spiker
Ángela Leyva (Universidad San Martín)
Best Blocker
Nair Canessa (Géminis)
Best Server
Cristina Cuba (Sporting Cristal)

Best Digger
Astrid Flores (Túpac Amaru)
Best Setter
Shiamara Almeida (Sporting Cristal)
Best Receiver
Hilary Palma (Sporting Cristal)
Best Libero
Violeta Delgado (Géminis)

References

External links
LNSV
Voleibol.pe

Volleyball competitions in Peru
2012 in Peruvian sport